Władysław Smoleński (1851–1926) was a Polish historian, author of many books and articles, and a professor of the Warsaw University.

Further reading

External links
 

1851 births
1926 deaths
20th-century Polish historians
Polish male non-fiction writers
Academic staff of the University of Warsaw
Burials at Powązki Cemetery
People from Mława County
19th-century Polish historians